Willian José da Silva (born 23 November 1991), known as Willian José, is a Brazilian professional footballer who plays as a forward for La Liga club Real Betis.

Club career

Grêmio Barueri
Born in Porto Calvo, Alagoas, Willian José started his career at local CRB's youth setup, before joining Grêmio Barueri in 2008, aged 17. On 1 August 2009 he made his first team – and Série A – debut, coming on as a late substitute in a 2–1 loss at Botafogo.

Willian José scored his first goal as a professional on 17 January of the following year, netting his side's only in a 1–1 draw at Sertãozinho for the Campeonato Paulista championship. He scored six further times during the campaign, which ended in relegation.

São Paulo
On 13 January 2011, Willian José joined São Paulo. He was mostly used as a backup to Luís Fabiano and Dagoberto in his first year, and despite the latter leaving for Internacional in 2012, he was still third-choice behind new signing Osvaldo.

Grêmio and Santos
On 13 December 2012, Willian José moved to Grêmio, but after appearing rarely he signed with Santos FC in May of the following year. He appeared in 28 matches during his only season at Peixe, scoring five goals.

Real Madrid
On 8 January 2014 Willian José moved abroad, signing a six-month deal with Real Madrid, being assigned to the reserves in Segunda División. After scoring a hat-trick in a 3–2 win at Recreativo de Huelva, he was called up for the main squad and was on the bench for the matches against Real Sociedad and UD Almería.

Willian José made his La Liga debut on 11 May, replacing compatriot Casemiro in a 2–0 loss at Celta de Vigo. In June, however, he was released.

Zaragoza

Willian José signed a one-year deal with Real Zaragoza in the second level on 29 August 2014. He made his debut for the club on 7 September, replacing David Muñoz in a 4–1 loss at FC Barcelona B.

Willian José scored his first goal for the club on 12 October 2014, in a 3–3 away draw against CD Lugo. He also scored braces against UD Las Palmas (3–5 away defeat) and Girona FC (4–1 away win), finishing the campaign with ten goals as his side missed out promotion in the play-offs.

Las Palmas
On 30 July 2015, Willian José signed a one-year contract with Las Palmas, newly promoted to the top tier. His first goal in the category occurred on 12 December, the game's only in a home success against Real Betis.

On 25 January 2016, Willian José scored a brace in a 3–2 loss at Levante UD. On 20 February, he scored a first-half equalizer against league leaders FC Barcelona, but the hosts would eventually lose by 2–1. He also scored the equalizer against former club Real Madrid on 13 March, but the hosts again lost by 2–1.

Real Sociedad
On 31 July 2016, Willian José signed a five-year deal with fellow league team Real Sociedad. On 21 September, he scored a double in a 4–1 home routing of former club Las Palmas.

Loan to Wolverhampton Wanderers
On 23 January 2021, Willian José joined Premier League club Wolverhampton Wanderers for the remainder of the 2020–21 season, with the option to make the deal permanent at its conclusion. José made his first appearance for Wolves as a second-half substitute in a 0–0 draw with Chelsea at Stamford Bridge on 27 January 2021, making a vital headed clearance of a goal-bound shot from Chelsea's Kai Havertz in the last minute of added time.

Willian José made his first start for Wolves in their next game away to Crystal Palace in the Premier League on 30 January 2021. He made his debut appearance at Molineux in a Premier League fixture against Arsenal on 2 February that Wolves won 2–1, thus ensuring Wolves did the league double over Arsenal in 2020–21 for the first time since 1978–79. José won the penalty that Rúben Neves converted for the first of Wolves's two goals.

On 9 April, Willian José scored what would have been his first goal for Wolves, in a 1–0 away win against Fulham, had it not been controversially disallowed by the video assistant referee, after a cross from Nélson Semedo to Daniel Podence was ruled offside. On 17 April, he did score his first Wolves goal in a 1–0 home league win over Sheffield United, sealing the Blades' relegation to the EFL Championship.

Loan to Real Betis
On 26 August 2021, Willian José joined La Liga rivals Real Betis on a season-long loan deal.

International career
In 2011, Willian José was a member of both the FIFA U-20 World Cup and South American Youth Championship winning squads with Brazil, scoring twice in the former and thrice in the latter.

On 12 March 2018, he received his first call-up for the senior team for two friendly matches against Russia and Germany, but he didn't play either one.

Career statistics

Honours
São Paulo
Copa Sudamericana: 2012

Real Madrid
Copa del Rey: 2013–14

Real Sociedad
Copa del Rey: 2019–20

Real Betis
Copa del Rey: 2021–22

Brazil U20
FIFA U-20 World Cup: 2011
South American Youth Championship: 2011

References

External links

Profile at the Real Betis website

1991 births
Living people
Sportspeople from Alagoas
Brazilian footballers
Association football forwards
Campeonato Brasileiro Série A players
Grêmio Barueri Futebol players
São Paulo FC players
Grêmio Foot-Ball Porto Alegrense players
Santos FC players
La Liga players
Segunda División players
Real Madrid Castilla footballers
Real Madrid CF players
Real Zaragoza players
UD Las Palmas players
Real Sociedad footballers
Real Betis players
Wolverhampton Wanderers F.C. players
Premier League players
Brazilian expatriate footballers
Brazilian expatriate sportspeople in Spain
Expatriate footballers in Spain
Brazil under-20 international footballers
Brazil youth international footballers